John Graham Manson Leslie (21 September 1952 – 13 April 2016), known as Jock Scot, was a Scottish poet and recording artist.

Born in Leith, one of seven children, he was raised on a housing estate in Musselburgh, where he was nicknamed "Pooch" Leslie because of his small size. He sold soft drinks locally and worked as a labourer on building sites, until, in 1978, he threw his tam o'shanter on to the stage at an Ian Dury concert in Edinburgh, and was invited backstage. Dury invited him to join his tour party, ending up in London where he moved in with Dury and Clash associate and publicity officer Kosmo Vinyl. He worked for Stiff Records and later Charisma Records, and befriended many of the luminaries of the London punk rock scene, including the members of the Clash, Shane MacGowan, Billy Bragg, and Vivian Stanshall.

Described as a "supplier of good vibes" to his friends, he began going on stage as a warm-up act for bands, reciting his poems. He regularly performed at the Edinburgh Fringe, toured with the band Rip Rig + Panic, and published a book of verse, Where Is My Heroine?, in 1993. The book drew on his earlier experience of heroin addiction in Scotland. In 1997 he recorded an album, My Personal Culloden, made with Davy Henderson of the band The Nectarine No. 9, and described at Allmusic as "a rich, fascinating travelogue through Scot's id, ego, history, and city, all delivered in his robust musical brogue against a backdrop of experimental rock pastiches and grooves." The album was reissued on CD in 2015.

According to his obituary in The Daily Telegraph: "He had startling presence, and a way of investing words with broad and deep meaning, and, with his interest in the Beat poets, horse racing and popular culture, straddled the worlds of London’s pub-land and the aristocratic demi-monde." He was diagnosed with cancer in 2014, but refused chemotherapy and died in 2016, aged 63.

Scot had three daughters: Tara, with fashion designer Joanne Scott; Poppy, with actress Anna Chancellor, with whom he lived in West London; and Iris, born in 2008, with Helen Montgomery, whom he married in 2005.

References

External links
 Colm McAuliffe, "A Long Lunch With Jock Scot, Robert Rubbish & Lias Saoudi", The Quietus, 2015

1952 births
2016 deaths
People from Leith
20th-century Scottish poets
Scottish male poets
20th-century British male writers